Ian Harwood (29 August 1931 – 28 July 2011) was a lutenist, musical instrument maker and teacher.

Early life
Harwood was born in Petersfield, Hampshire and attended The Pilgrims' School while a chorister at Winchester Cathedral.

Career
As a conscientious objector he completed his National Service operating a synchrotron at Addenbrooke's Hospital, as the machine broke down frequently he used his spare time in the workshop to construct his first lute. In 1956 he co-founded the lute society, and then became an alto lay clerk in the Choir of New College, Oxford where he began a career playing and making lutes near Oxford.

In 1960 he took up a position as a lay clerk at Ely Cathedral, where he built lutes for ten years. In 1964 he received the Tovey Prize for research into the sources of English lute music. He performed and recorded lute music with consorts such as the Campian Consort which he founded in 1967.

Harwood's research identified Mathew Holmes as the author of a collection of Elizabethan lute books, described as being more important than the Fitzwilliam Virginal Book.

Harwood was elected president of the Lute Society in 1999 and appointed MBE in 2008.

Publications
 Harwood, Ian, "The Origins of the Cambridge Lute Manuscripts", Lute Society Journal vol. 5 pp. 32–48 (1963).
 Harwood, Ian, "The Origins of the Cambridge Lute Manuscripts: A Postscript", Lute Society Journal vol. 6 p. 29 (1964).

 Harwood, Ian, "A Lecture in Musick, with the Practice thereof by Instrument in the Common Schooles, Mathew Holmes and Music at Oxford University c.1588-1627", Lute Society Journal vol. 45 pp. 1–70 (2005)
 Harwood, Ian, John H. Robinson and Stewart McCoy (eds), The Mathew Holmes Manuscripts I: Cambridge University Library MS Dd.2.11 (Albury: Lute Society, 2010).

References

1931 births
2011 deaths
Lute makers
English lutenists
British performers of early music
British child singers
Members of the Order of the British Empire
Lay Clerks of New College, Oxford